Twelve Angry Men is a play by Reginald Rose adapted from his 1954 teleplay of the same title for the CBS Studio One anthology television series. Staged first in San Francisco in 1955, the Broadway debut came 50 years after CBS aired the play, on October 28, 2004, by the Roundabout Theatre Company at the American Airlines Theatre, where it ran for 328 performances.

Characters and story

The drama depicts a jury forced to consider a homicide trial.  At the beginning, they have a nearly unanimous decision of guilty, with a single dissenter of "undecided", who throughout the play sows a seed of reasonable doubt. The story begins after closing arguments have been presented in the homicide case, as the judge is giving his instructions to the jury. As in most American criminal cases, the twelve men must unanimously decide on a verdict of "guilty" or "not guilty". (In the justice systems of nearly all American states, failure to reach a unanimous verdict, a so-called "hung jury", results in a mistrial.) The case at hand pertains to whether a young man murdered his own father. The jury is further instructed that a guilty verdict will be accompanied by a mandatory death sentence. In the jury room, they begin to become acquainted with the personalities of their peers. Several of the jurors have different reasons for discriminating against the defendant: his race, his background, and the troubled relationship between one juror and his own son. The one dissenter gradually wins over the other jurors to a unanimous not-guilty verdict, by questioning the reliability of the evidence presented in court and exposing his fellow jurors' prejudices.

The characters are unnamed; throughout their deliberation, not a single juror calls another by his name, and they are identified in the script merely by number.

Productions
Rose wrote several variations on his own stage adaptation of the teleplay.

Dramatic rights to the film were sold and several versions based on the film were staged. It was staged in San Francisco in 1955 and in Europe in 1958, including an adaptation by Andre Obey in Paris.

In 1964, Leo Genn appeared in the London production, directed by Margaret Webster. For other theatrical adaptations, wherein female actors are cast, the play is often retitled 12 Angry People or 12 Angry Jurors.

Harold Pinter directed a production of the play, which opened at the Bristol Old Vic on March 7, 1996.  With set design by Eileen Diss, lighting design by Mick Hughes, and costume design by Tom Rand, its cast included Stuart Rayner (Juror 1, Foreman), Kevin Dignam (Juror 2), Tony Haygarth (Juror 3), Timothy West (Juror 4), Maurice Kaufmann (Juror 5), Douglas McFerran (Juror 6), Tim Healy (Juror 7), Kevin Whately (Juror 8), Alan MacNaughtan (Juror 9), Peter Vaughan (Juror 10), Robert East (Juror 11), Christopher Simon (Juror 12), Joshua Losey (Guard), and E. G. Marshall, as the Voice of the Judge. Marshall had portrayed "#4" in Sidney Lumet's 1957 film version of the play. The production transferred to the Comedy Theatre in London the same year.

In 2003, the British producer/director Guy Masterson directed an all comedian revival at the Assembly Rooms including Bill Bailey as Juror 4, Phil Nichol as Juror 10, Owen O'Neill as Juror 8, Stephen Frost as Juror 3 and Russell Hunter as Juror 9 during the Edinburgh Fringe Festival which broke the existing box office record for drama at the Fringe Festival and garnered much critical acclaim.

The Roundabout Theatre Company presented a Broadway production of the play in 2004, starring Boyd Gaines as a more combative Juror 8, with James Rebhorn (Juror 4), Philip Bosco (Juror 3), and Robert Prosky as the Voice of the Judge. Prosky had starred as "#3" in a Washington D.C. production of the show, opposite Roy Scheider as "#8" and Rene Auberjonois as "#5".

In 2005, the British producer/director Guy Masterson directed a hugely successful Australian version of his hit Edinburgh 2003 production produced by Arts Projects Australia and Adrian Bohm at QPAC Brisbane, Sydney Theatre and Melbourne Athenaeum including Shane Bourne as Juror 3, Peter Phelps as Juror 4, Marcus Graham as Juror 8, George Kapiniaris as Juror 2 and Henri Szeps as Juror 9. This production won three Melbourne Green Room Awards and a nomination for "Best Play" at the Helpmann Awards.

In 2007, L.A. Theatre Works presented a production of the play that was recorded as an audiobook; directed by John de Lancie, the cast included Dan Castellaneta, Jeffrey Donovan, Héctor Elizondo, Robert Foxworth, James Gleason, Kevin Kilner, Richard Kind, Alan Mandell, Rob Nagle, Armin Shimerman, Joe Spano, and Steve Vinovich.

The London West End production opened in November 2013 (running until March 1, 2014) at the Garrick Theatre. Directed by Christopher Haydon, the cast included Martin Shaw, Robert Vaughn, Jeff Fahey, Nick Moran, Robert Blythe, Miles Richardson and Martin Turner.

In 2014, Independent Theatre Pakistan performed an adaptation of this play at Alhamra Arts Council, Lahore, directed by Azeem Hamid.

Screen adaptations
A 1954 television production for Studio One

Cast:
 Norman Fell – Foreman/Juror #1
 John Beal – Juror #2
 Franchot Tone – Juror #3
 Walter Abel – Juror #4
 Lee Phillips – Juror #5
 Bart Burns – Juror #6
 Paul Hartman – Juror #7
 Robert Cummings – Juror #8
 Joseph Sweeney – Juror #9
 Edward Arnold – Juror #10
 George Voskovec – Juror #11
 Larkin Ford – Juror #12 (credited as "Will West")

Sweeney and Voskovec repeated their parts in the 1957 film.

A 1957 feature film adaptation, produced and written by Rose himself, and directed by Sidney Lumet. Nominated for 3 Academy Awards: Best Picture, Best Director and Best Adapted Screenplay.

Cast:
 Martin Balsam as Juror #1 (Foreman)
 John Fiedler as Juror #2
 Lee J. Cobb as Juror #3
 E. G. Marshall as Juror #4
 Jack Klugman as Juror #5
 Edward Binns as Juror #6
 Jack Warden as Juror #7
 Henry Fonda as Juror #8/Davis
 Joseph Sweeney as Juror #9 (McCardle)
 Ed Begley as Juror #10
 George Voskovec as Juror #11
 Robert Webber as Juror #12

A 1997 feature film adaptation, directed by William Friedkin.

Cast:
 Courtney B. Vance as Juror #1 (Foreman)
 Ossie Davis as Juror #2
 George C. Scott as Juror #3
 Armin Mueller-Stahl as Juror #4
 Dorian Harewood as Juror #5
 James Gandolfini as Juror #6
 Tony Danza as Juror #7
 Jack Lemmon Juror #8
 Hume Cronyn as Juror #9
 Mykelti Williamson as Juror #10
 Edward James Olmos as Juror #11
 William Petersen as Juror #12

12. A 2007 film adaptation. Director Nikita Michalkov

Cast:
 Sergei Makovetsky – Juror #1
 Nikita Mikhalkov – Juror #2
 Sergei Garmash – Juror #3
 Valentin Gaft – Juror #4
 Alexei Petrenko – Juror #5
 Yuri Stoyanov – Juror #6
 Sergei Gazarov – Juror #7
 Mikhail Yefremov – Juror #8
 Alexey Gorbunov – Juror #9
 Sergei Artsibashev – Juror #10
 Viktor Verzhbitsky – Juror #11
 Roman Madyanov – Juror #12
 Alexander Adabashyan – Bailiff
 Apti Magamayev – Chechen boy

Awards and nominations

2004 Broadway revival

See also
 Minority influence

References

Further reading

External links
 

1954 plays
American plays
Broadway plays
Drama Desk Award-winning plays
Edgar Award-winning works
Plays based on television plays
West End plays
Juries in fiction
Courtroom drama plays
Twelve Angry Men